Reilly O'Brien (born 20 August 1995) is an Australian rules footballer playing for the Adelaide Football Club in the Australian Football League (AFL).

Early life
O'Brien participated in the Auskick programs at Flemington Primary School in Flemington, Victoria and at Moonee Valley Football Club. He played his junior football with the Calder Cannons in the TAC Cup.

O'Brien was drafted by the Adelaide Football Club with their first selection and ninth overall in the 2014 rookie draft.

AFL Career

References

External links

1995 births
Living people
Adelaide Football Club players
Calder Cannons players
Australian rules footballers from Melbourne
Coburg Football Club players
Malcolm Blight Medal winners
People educated at St Kevin's College, Melbourne
People from Flemington, Victoria